Egnyte is a software company headquartered in Mountain View, California. It sells cloud-based content security, compliance, and collaboration tools for businesses. Egnyte was founded in 2007 with a focus on modernized file servers, but it has since shifted to selling tools that help users securely collaborate with coworkers and third parties.

History 
Egnyte was founded in 2007, and incorporated in 2008. The privately-held company was founded by Vineet Jain, Rajesh Ram, Kris Lahiri, and Amrit Jassal. 

Egnyte received $1 million seed venture capital in 2007, $6 million in July 2009, $10 million in 2011, and $16 million in 2012. Egnyte announced a $29.5 million investment in 2013 that included Seagate, CenturyLink, Northgate Capital, and prior investors Kleiner Perkins, Google Ventures and Polaris Partners. In 2018, Egnyte has raised $137.5 million, including $75 million in Series E funding in 2018, led by Goldman Sachs.

By the end of 2019, the company reported having more than 16,000 customers worldwide, and it had reached more than $100 million in annual recurring revenue.

Egnyte initially sold cloud and on-premises file servers but later added features for collaboration and security and shifted its focus to cloud content governance for businesses. In 2020, it combined its two primary products—Egnyte Protect and Egnyte Connect—into one platform to manage, govern, and secure data.

That year, the long vacated CFO position, previously held by Steve Sutter, was filled by Suzanne Colvin, former CFO at Napster.

In January 2022, the company announced that it was seeking an IPO. Later that month, it was announced that Alexa King, former executive VP at FireEye would serve as a board director.

Features 
The Egnyte platform provides content security, compliance, and collaboration capabilities to govern content. Egnyte's software can be used to scan a range of data repositories for malware—including email, on-premises storage, and third-party cloud storage—and block ransomware attacks from spreading. Egnyte also has a Governance Risk Dashboard that analyzes an organization’s risk level and provides feedback on areas of improvement.

Egnyte’s collaboration features include cloud storage, as well as co-editing of files in Microsoft 365 and Google Workspace. Egnyte uses machine learning to predictably cache files for faster local access and to automatically categorize sensitive content.

Egnyte integrates with a number of business productivity tools, including Box, OneDrive, DropBox, Slack, Microsoft 365, Google Workspace, AWS, and Salesforce. It also sells industry-specific software to the construction and life sciences industries.

Egnyte offers tiered pricing plans with varying capabilities. For example, all of its SaaS subscribers get ransomware protection against 2,000 known threats and file versioning, while enterprise customers have access to file restoration and abnormal activity detection features.

See also
Cloud storage
Comparison of file synchronization software
Content management
File sharing
Hybrid cloud
On-premises software

References

File hosting
Data synchronization
File sharing services
Cloud storage
Email attachment replacements
Online backup services
File hosting for Linux
File hosting for macOS
File hosting for Windows